The Women's Javelin Throw was one of three women's throwing events on the Athletics at the 1964 Summer Olympics program in Tokyo.  It was held on 16 October 1964.  16 athletes from 10 nations entered.

Results

Qualification

The qualification standard was 51.00 metres.  Each thrower had three attempts to reach that standard.  Since only 7 throwers made the mark, the next five furthest-throwing athletes also advanced to meet the minimum 12 in the final.

Gorchakova set a new world record, besting the old one by more than 2.5 metres.  Ozolina also had a good round, besting the old Olympic record to come in second in qualification.

Final

The qualification marks were ignored for the final, each thrower receiving three new attempts.  The top six throwers after those three received three more attempts, taking their best result of the six.

No one came close to equalling Gorchakova's qualifying round throw, her own attempts in the final not coming within 5 metres of it as she dropped to third place.

References

Athletics at the 1964 Summer Olympics
Javelin throw at the Olympics
1964 in women's athletics
Women's events at the 1964 Summer Olympics